Ben White is an American journalist known for his coverage of finance and policy.

Presently the chief economic correspondent for Politico, before joining Politico in 2009, worked for The New York Times. between 2005 and 2007, he was U.S. Banking Editor and Wall Street correspondent for the Financial Times. He had previously been Wall Street correspondent for The Washington Post''''.

White writes Politico's Morning Money column on the interface between public policy and finance.  Business Insider describes White's coverage of the fiscal cliff as "second to none."

In 2009, while working at The New York Times'', White shared a Society of Business Editors and Writers (SABEW) award for breaking news coverage of the financial crisis of 2007–08.

White is a 1994 graduate of Kenyon College.

References

External links

American male journalists
Year of birth missing (living people)
Living people
Kenyon College alumni
Politico people